Castagnole may refer to several places in Italy:

Castagnole delle Lanze, a municipality in the Province of Asti, Piedmont
Castagnole Monferrato, a municipality in the Province of Asti, Piedmont
Castagnole Piemonte, a municipality in the Province of Turin, Piedmont
Castagnole (Paese), a civil parish of Paese, province of Treviso, Veneto

See also 
Castagnola (disambiguation)